Inks Lake State Park is a state park located in Burnet County, Texas, United States, next to Inks Lake on the Colorado River.  The landscape of the park is hilly, with many cedar, live oak, prickly pear cacti, and yuccas.  The ground is rocky, mainly consisting of gneiss rock.

Devil's Waterhole is a small extension of Inks Lake, which is almost completely surrounded by rock.  A canoe tour is conducted at Devil's Waterhole, and although diving and swimming may be done at the waterhole, it is at one's own risk, without a lifeguard.

There is abundant wildlife at the park, including deer, vultures, quail, and many other types of birds.

Geology 
The park is located in the eastern edge of a Mesoproterozoic exposure within the Llano Uplift.

A visible, slightly pinkish rock peeks through the limestone rock in the park, a type of metamorphic rock called Valley Spring gneiss (“nice”). This metamorphic rock is often mistaken for town mountain granite since they are very similar in color and texture. The small granite that only appears in the park has veins cutting through the gneiss in and around the rock.

Over millions of years, intense heat and pressure are frequently applied to the original rock that eventually formed these gneiss rocks. The original rocks were sedimentary (formed from sand, silt, and mud) and igneous (likely granite). Inks lake contains many wildflowers, grasses, forbs, mosses, lichens, and ferns that grow on these rocky outcrops. Over hundreds of years, larger rocks are broken down into gravels and soil by the plants that grow in crevices and at the outcrops' base.

Water conditions 
                                                                                                                                                                                                                                       
Conservation Pool Elevation usually stays around 888.22 ft. msl; however, this lake does fluctuate about 1 foot annually. Inks lake water clarity can be seen as clear to slightly stained mostly throughout the year. It tends to have higher turbidity during the rainy season due to excessive amounts of runoff.

Aquatic Vegetation 

There was no significant sign of aquatic vegetation present at this lake.

Fishing Regulations 

All species of fish are currently managed under statewide regulations. Bow fishers on this lake are subject matter to a special regulations which is enforced by the LCRA (.Lower Colorado River Authority)

Angling Opportunities 

Inks Lake is most noted for its picturesque scenery, but the fishing here can be good as well. It includes under-rated largemouth bass and Guadalupe bass populations, along with several species of sunfish (bream). White bass are regularly caught in the reservoir, and a low-density white crappie population is present. Channel and flathead catfish occur throughout the reservoir.

Fishing Cover/Structure 

Inks Lake offers a wide variety of cover and structure for fishes species. The shoreline contains various rock piles, ledges, and chunk rock banks. Brush piles and gravel beds have been placed near fishing piers and other strategic locations to attract more fish. Several private boat docks, particularly on the west side of the lake, hold fish year-round. Watercolor in the reservoir is fairly clear.

Reservoir Controlling Authority 
Lower Colorado River Authority

3700 Lake Austin Blvd.

Austin, Texas 78703

(512) 473-3200 or 1(800) 776-5272

Lake Maps 
Good commercial maps are available at area map, tackle, and sporting goods stores. A free, downloadable camping guide of the Highland Lakes area is available in the map section of the LCRA website.

References 

 Inks Lake State Park from the Texas Parks and Wildlife Department website. January 8, 2006.
  from the USGS website. January 17, 2006.

External links

 
Film of Inks Lake State Park in Adventure at Our Door (c. 1959) from the Texas Archive of the Moving Image

State parks of Texas
Protected areas of Burnet County, Texas
Protected areas established in 1950
1950 establishments in Texas